"V.I.P" is a song by Nigerian hip hop recording artist Ice Prince. It was released on April 24, 2013, by Chocolate City. The song was originally intended to be included on Ice Prince's second studio album Fire of Zamani (2013), but was ultimately removed from the final track-listing due to reasons that haven't been made public. It peaked at 26 on Afribiz's Top 100 chart. "V.I.P" debuted at number 9 on MTV Base's Official Naija Top 10 chart from July 6 through July 13, 2013. It entered the music countdown alongside "Personally".

Critical reception
Upon its release, the song was met with mixed reviews from music critics. A writer for Jaguda.com said, "One first listen, VIP sounds eerily similar to Aboki. If I didn't see the name, I would've thought it was a remix sorta." Aribaba, another writer for Jaguda.com, gave the song 5 stars out of 10, stating, "I'm an Ice Prince fan, but I must say I was kinda disappointed. Paper chasing tactics I guess. Now with that being said, the song will probably still do well, and as a stand-alone song it's actually good. The beat is solid from Chopstix, and Ice Prince style stays the same (obviously) and the chorus is nice, just like with Aboki. It's just not fresh and doesn't get one excited."

Music video

Background
The music video for "V.I.P" was directed by Clarence Peters at Dream Studios. It was uploaded onto YouTube on June 21, 2013. M.I, Dr SID, N6, Phyno, Lynxxx, Iyanya, Emma Nyra, Pryse, GRIP Boiz, and Illbliss made cameo appearances in the video. A behind the scenes video shoot for "V.I.P" was uploaded onto YouTube on June 11, 2013.

Controversy
After the release of Ice Prince's "V.I.P" music video on 21 June 2013, Peters was accused of plagiarising the style of Slaughterhouse's "My Life" video and incorporating it into the "V.I.P" video. In February 2014, Ice Prince defended the actions of Peters and said he told him the ideas to shoot. He also said that if anyone has a problem with the situation, they should hold him responsible.

Accolades
The music video for "V.I.P" was nominated for Best Use of Visual Effects and Best Hip Hop Video at the 2013 Nigeria Music Video Awards.

Track listing
 Digital single

Release history

References

2013 songs
2013 singles
Ice Prince songs